TJ Tatran Bohunice is a Czech sports club from the district of Bohunice in Brno. Currently (season 2022/23) the football section plays in the Division D, the fourth tier of Czech competitive football. Founded in 1929 as SK Slavoj Brno-Bohunice. Club has played its home games at the Tatran Bohunice Stadium with capacity of 600 peoples.

TJ Tatran is best known for the success of the association football department within the club. However, TJ Tatran does have the departments for the other sports such as: handball (men's and women's).

Historical names 

Sources: 

 1929 – SK Slavoj Brno-Bohunice (Sportovní klub (Sports club) Slavoj Brno-Bohunice)
 1948 – JTO Sokol Brno-Bohunice (Jednotná tělovýchovná organisace (Unified physical education organization) Sokol Brno-Bohunice)
 1953 – DSO Tatran Brno-Bohunice (Dobrovolná sportovní organisace (Voluntary sports organization) Tatran Bohunice)
 1956 – TJ Tatran Brno-Bohunice (Tělovýchovná jednota (Physical education unity) Tatran Brno-Bohunice)
 1991 – Tatran Brno-Bohunice
 2013 – TJ Tatran Bohunice (Tělovýchovná jednota (Physical education unity) Tatran Bohunice)

Season-by-season record

Association football 

Sources:

Association football (reserve team; defunct) 

Sources:

Men's handball 

Sources:

Women's handball 

Sources:

References

External links 
  

1929 establishments in Czechoslovakia
Football clubs in the Czech Republic
Czech handball clubs
Sport in Brno
Association football clubs established in 1929